Mitchell Dean Canham (born September 25, 1984) is an American baseball coach and former catcher. He is currently the Pat Casey Head Baseball Coach at Oregon State University  
and previously served as the manager of the Clinton LumberKings, Modesto Nuts and the Arkansas Travelers.

In college, he played for the Oregon State Beavers baseball team. Canham was a member of both the 2006 and 2007 OSU teams which won back-to-back NCAA Baseball National Championships at the College World Series in Omaha, Nebraska. He was drafted by the San Diego Padres of Major League Baseball with the 57th overall pick in the 2007 Major League Baseball Draft.

Amateur career

Canham played for the Lake Stevens Junior Athletic Association (LSJAA) Tigers from 1995-1996. Canham attended Lake Stevens High School in Lake Stevens, Washington, where he was a three-sport star and honor student.

Canham was named to the preseason All-American second team by the Collegiate Baseball newspaper and as a third team All-American by Baseball America. He ended the season as a third-team All-American selection by the Collegiate Baseball newspaper. In 2006, he played collegiate summer baseball with the Falmouth Commodores of the Cape Cod Baseball League and was named a league all-star.

Professional career

With the Emeralds Canham batted .293 with two home runs, four doubles, one triple, 34 hits and 18 RBIs in 28 games. In just two games with the Storm Canham had no hits and one RBI.

In  Canham spent the entire season with Lake Elsinore of the California League. He hit .285 with eight home runs, 28 doubles, five triples, 119 hits, 13 steals and 81 RBI in 113 games.

 saw Canham a promotion to the Double-A San Antonio Missions of the Texas League. He finished the '09 campaign batting .263 with six home runs, 20 doubles, three triples, 107 hits, five stolen bases and 53 RBI in 111 games.

Coaching career
Canham was named the manager of the Clinton LumberKings for the 2016 season. In 2017 and 2018, Canham was the manager of the Modesto Nuts. Canham managed the Arkansas Travelers for the first half of the 2019 season before resigning.

On June 13, 2019, Canham was named the head coach for the Oregon State. In July 2022, he signed a contract extension with the Beavers through the 2029 season.

Head coaching record

Personal life
Canham's mother died while he was a freshman in college. His younger brother, Dustin Canham, died in 2008 while serving with the United States Marines in Djibouti; the circumstances surrounding Dustin Canham's death received national attention based on a perceived cover up by the military and allegations that the death was due to hazing.

Canham's great uncle, Major General Charles D. W. Canham, commanded the 29th Infantry Division's 116th Infantry Regiment during its D-Day landing on Omaha Beach, earning the Distinguished Service Cross for valor in combat.

Canham and his wife, Marlis, have two children.

References

External links

Living people
1984 births
Baseball coaches from Washington (state)
Baseball players from Washington (state)
People from Richland, Washington
Oregon State Beavers baseball players
Falmouth Commodores players
Lake Elsinore Storm players
Eugene Emeralds players
San Antonio Missions players
Portland Beavers players
Midland RockHounds players
Sacramento River Cats players
Memphis Redbirds players
Long Island Ducks players
Northwest Arkansas Naturals players
Omaha Storm Chasers players
Harrisburg Senators players
Peoria Saguaros players
Lincoln Saltdogs players
Minor league baseball managers
People from Lake Stevens, Washington
Oregon State Beavers baseball coaches